Mohammadgarh State, also spelt as 'Muhammadgarh', was a former princely state in Central India, under the Bhopal Agency during the British Raj. It was situated in the Malwa Plateau. Its headquarters were at Mohammadgarh town.

History
Mohammadgarh state was established in 1842 with parts of Basoda and Kurwai states, when Ahsanullah Khan, the Nawab of Basoda divided his state between two sons, Bakaulla and Muhammad Khan. The latter became acknowledged as founder of the town of Muhammadgarh was founded by Muhammed Khan and named by his name, and state of Muhammadgarh. The rulers of Mohammadgarh refused to accept the overlordship of Gwalior State, retaining their independence. 

The Nawab of Mohammadgarh was one of the original constituents of the Chamber of Princes, an institution established in 1920. Mohammadgarh state would remain a British protectorate until 1947, when its last ruler signed the accession to the Indian Union.
 
Although the rulers of this native state belonged to a Muslim Pathan dynasty, over 80% of the population of Muhammadgarh State followed the Hindu religion. In June 1947 the state became part of  Madhya Bharat, until all the princely states were abolished. Then the state's territory was integrated in Madhya Pradesh.

Rulers
The all rulers bore title of Nawab.

Nawabs

1842 – 1896               Nawab Hafiz Quli Khan  
1896 – 1910               Nawab Hatim Quli Khan              
1910 – 1942               Nawab Siddiq Quli Khan  
1942 – 1948               Nawab Muhammad Sabir Quli Khan
Present Nawab  Alamgeer Quli khan

See also
Bhopawar Agency
List of Sunni Muslim dynasties
Political integration of India
Pathans of Madhya Pradesh

References

Vidisha district
Muslim princely states of India
States and territories established in 1853
Pashtun dynasties
1818 establishments in India